Jens Kraemer (born July 14, 1963) is a Canadian former soccer player and head coach who is currently the head coach for the semi-professional club Darby.

Playing career 
Kraemer began his career in 1980 in the National Soccer League with London City. In 1983, he played with the Toronto Nationals of the Canadian Professional Soccer League. In 1984, he played with London Marconi for four seasons. In 1988, he played in the Canadian Soccer League with the North York Rockets. After a six-year tenure in the CSL he signed with the Toronto Rockets of the American Professional Soccer League.  In total he would appear in five matches for the club.

In 1995, he signed with Toronto Italia of the Canadian National Soccer League. The following season he signed with Oakville Western Canadians, and made his debut for the club on June 2, 1996, in a match against North York Talons.

Managerial career 
In 1997, he was the head coach for Oshawa Adria in the Motor City Soccer League. In 1999, he was appointed the head coach for Oshawa Flames of the Canadian Professional Soccer League. The following season he coached in the Ontario Soccer League with Markham SC. In 2004, he served as the head coach to Canada's women U-15 national team. He was also named the head coach for Whitby Iroquois SC.

In 2011, he was named a regional scout for TFC Academy in the Durham region. In 2016, he was named as an assistant coach for the Durham College soccer team. 

He joined Darby FC as an assistant coach, becoming head coach in 2022.

References 

1963 births
Living people
Footballers from Hamburg
Canadian soccer players
Canadian soccer coaches
London City players
North York Rockets players
Toronto Rockets players
Toronto Italia players
Canadian Soccer League (1987–1992) players
American Professional Soccer League players
Canadian Soccer League (1998–present) managers
Canadian National Soccer League players
Association football defenders
Toronto Nationals (soccer) players
Canadian Professional Soccer League (original) players